

Events
April 7 – Johnny Dio is convicted of income tax evasion and later sentenced to four years imprisonment and a $5,000 fine.
November 28 – Twenty mobsters arrested at the Apalachin Conference in 1957 are acquitted of conspiracy charges by a US appeals court.

Arts and literature
Murder, Inc. (film)  starring Henry Morgan, Peter Falk, Vincent Gardenia and Howard Smith.
The Purple Gang (film)  starring Barry Sullivan and Robert Blake.

Births
Carmine Agnello, member of Gambino crime family
June 21 – Costabile Farace, Mafia associate
September – Luigi Putrone, Sicilian Mafia boss

Deaths
Ezio Galanzo (1932 - 1965), member of the Gambino Crime Family

Notes

Organized crime
Years in organized crime